This is a list of video games that are set in World War I.

Adventure games 
Valiant Hearts: The Great War (2014)
Castlevania: Bloodlines (1994)
The Last Express (1997)
11-11: Memories Retold (2018)

Action games 
The Young Indiana Jones Chronicles (video game) (1992)
Instruments of Chaos starring Young Indiana Jones (1994)
The Snowfield (2011)

Horror games 
NecroVision (2009)
NecrovisioN: Lost Company (2010)

Survival horror 
Eternal Darkness: Sanity's Requiem (2002)

First-person shooters 
Codename Eagle (1999)
Iron Storm (2002)
Darkest of Days (2009)
Screaming Steel: 1914-1918 (2018) (Mod for Day of Infamy (2017))
Battlefield 1 (2016)
Beyond The Wire (2020)

Tactical shooters 
Verdun (2015)
Tannenberg (2019)
Isonzo (2022)

Third-person shooters 
Sky Kid (1985)

Combat flight simulators 
Wings (1990)
Wings 2: Aces High (1992)
Red Baron (1990)
Red Baron II (1997)
Dawn Patrol (1994)
Flying Corps (1996)
Snoopy vs. the Red Baron (2006)
Snoopy Flying Ace (2010)
Rise of Flight: The First Great Air War (2009)
Red Baron (1980)
Sopwith (1984)
Blue Max: Aces of the Great War (1990)
Chocks Away (1990)
Knights of the Sky (1990)
Warbirds (video game) (1991)
Dogfight: 80 Years of Aerial Warfare (1993)
Aces of the Deep (1994)
Wings of Glory (1994)
Master of the Skies: The Red Ace (2000)
Red Ace Squadron (2001)
Wings of War (2004)
First Eagles: The Great War 1918 (2006)
Time Ace (2007)
Air Conflicts: Secret Wars (2011)

Naval simulators 
Dreadnoughts (video game) (1992)
Jutland (2006)
1914 Shells of Fury (2007)

Real-time strategy 
Empire Earth (video game) (2001)
Empire Earth II (2005)
Powermonger Expansion Disk (1991)
The Ancient Art of War in the Skies (1992)
The Entente: Battlefields WW1 (2003)
Aggression – Reign over Europe (2008)
Warfare 1917 (2008)
World War One (2008)
Toy Soldiers (2010)
Call of Cthulhu: The Wasted Land (2012)
The Great War: Western Front (2023)

Turn-based strategy 
 The Operational Art of War series 
History Line: 1914-1918 (1992)
Imperialism (1997)

Turn-based tactics 
Hogs of War (2000)

Grand strategy wargames 
Victoria: An Empire Under the Sun (2003)
Victoria: Revolutions (2006)
Victoria 2 (2010)
Darkest Hour: A Hearts of Iron Game (2011)
Strategic Command series
Supremacy 1914 (2009)
Making History: The Great War (2015)
Supreme Ruler The Great War (2017)

References 

World War I video games
 
Video games